Antonio Braga (22 January 1929 – 26 May 2009<ref>{{Cite web|url=http://guide.supereva.it/critica_di_musica_classica/interventi/2009/12/lautobiografia-incompiuta-di-antonio-braga|title = Lautobiografia incompiuta di Antonio Braga}}</ref> in Naples) was an Italian classical composer. Born in Naples, he wrote ballets, concerto, ouvertures, symphonies and three operas.

Works

Ballets
Les Abeilles a Naples (1955)
C’è un albero a New York (1960)
El trono de Abomè (1988)

Symphony and Concertos
Ouverture napolitaine (1955)
Concerto exotique (1959)
Travel into Latins (1969)
Hispaniola (1969)
My four city (1997)

Operas and oratorios1492 epopea lirica d'America (1992)San Domenico di Guzman (1997)San Francesco d'AssisiAdaptation
Translation from Neapolitan language to French of Miseria e nobiltà (1887) (Misère et Noblesse, 1956) by Eduardo Scarpetta.

Bibliography
Andrea Jelardi, Il maestro Antonio Braga'', in: Realtà Sannita n.11 del 16.10.1998

References

1929 births
2009 deaths
20th-century classical composers
Italian classical composers
Italian male classical composers
Italian opera composers
Male opera composers
Musicians from Naples
20th-century Italian composers
20th-century Italian male musicians